Christopher Robin Milne (21 August 1920 – 20 April 1996) was an English author and bookseller and the only child of author A. A. Milne. As a child, he was the basis of the character Christopher Robin in his father's Winnie-the-Pooh stories and in two books of poems.

Early life
Christopher Robin Milne was born at 11 Mallord Street, Chelsea, London, on 21 August 1920, to author Alan Alexander Milne and Daphne (née de Sélincourt) Milne. Milne speculated that he was an only child because "he had been a long time coming." From an early age, Milne was cared for by his nanny Olive "Nou" Rand Brockwell, until May 1930, when he entered boarding school. Milne called her Nou, and stated "Apart from her fortnight's holiday every September, we had not been out of each other's sight for more than a few hours at a time", and "we lived together in a large nursery on the top floor."

Milne's father explained that Rosemary was the intended name of their first born child, if it was a girl. Realizing that it was going to be a boy, he decided on Billy, but without the intention of actually christening him William. Instead, each parent chose a name, hence his legal name was Christopher Robin. Within the family, he was referred to as Billy Moon, a combination of his nickname and his childhood mispronunciation of Milne. From 1929 onwards, he would simply be referred to as Christopher, and he later stated that it was "The only name I feel to be really mine."

On his first birthday on 21 August 1921, Milne received an Alpha Farnell teddy bear, which he later named Edward. Eeyore was a Christmas present in 1921 and Piglet arrived undated. Edward, along with a real Canadian black bear named Winnipeg that Milne saw at London Zoo, eventually became the inspiration for the Winnie-the-Pooh character.

Milne spoke self-deprecatingly of his own intellect, "I may have been on the dim side", or "not very bright". He also described himself as being "good with his hands", and possessing a Meccano set. His self-descriptions included "girlish", since he had long hair and wore "girlish clothes", and being "very shy and 'un-self-possessed'".

An early childhood friend was Anne Darlington, also an only child, who as Milne described it, was for his parents "the Rosemary that I wasn't." Anne Darlington had a toy monkey, Jumbo, as dear to her as Pooh was to Christopher. Several poems by Milne, and several illustrations by E. H. Shepard, feature Anne and Christopher, notably "Buttercup Days", in which their relative hair colours (brown and golden blond) and their mutual affection is noted (the illustration to this latter poem, from Now We Are Six, also features the cottage at Cotchford Farm). To Alan and Daphne Milne, Anne was and remained to her death the Rosemary that Christopher wasn't, and Daphne long held fond hopes that Anne and Christopher would marry.

In 1925, Milne's father bought Cotchford Farm, near the Ashdown Forest in East Sussex. Though still living in London, the family would spend weekends, Easter, and summer holidays there. As Milne described it, "So there we were in 1925 with a cottage, a little bit of garden, a lot of jungle, two fields, a river, and then all the green, hilly countryside beyond, meadows and woods, waiting to be explored." The place became the inspiration for fiction, with Milne stating, "Gill's Lap that inspired Galleon's Lap, the group of pine trees on the other side of the main road that became the Six Pine Trees, the bridge over the river at Posingford that became Pooh-sticks Bridge," and a nearby "ancient walnut tree" became Pooh's House. His toys, Pooh, Eeyore, Piglet, plus two invented characters, Owl and Rabbit, came to life through Milne and his mother, to the point where his father could write stories about them. Kanga, Roo, and Tigger were later presents from his parents.

Of this time, Milne states, "I loved my Nanny, I loved Cotchford. I also quite liked being Christopher Robin and being famous."

When his nanny departed when he was nine, Milne's relationship with his father grew. As he put it, "For nearly ten years I had clung to Nanny. For nearly ten more years I was to cling to him, adoring him as I had adored Nanny, so that he too became almost a part of me ..."

When Milne eventually wrote his memoirs, he dedicated them to Olive Rand Brockwell, "Alice to millions, but Nou to me".

Schooling
At age six, Milne and Anne Darlington attended Miss Walters' school. On 15 January 1929, Milne started at Gibbs, a boys' day school in Sloane Square, London. In May 1930, he started boarding school at Boxgrove School near Guildford. Of his time at boarding school, Milne said, "For it was now that began that love-hate relationship with my fictional namesake that has continued to this day."His father's books were popular, meaning they were well known by his schoolmates, which made Milne a target of bullying by the other children. Milne later described the poem "Vespers" – about the toddler Christopher Robin saying his evening prayers – as "the one [work] that has brought me over the years more toe-curling, fist-clenching, lip-biting embarrassment than any other."

Milne earned a mathematics scholarship at Stowe School, where he was relentlessly bullied, and wrote: "It seemed to me almost that my father had got to where he was by climbing upon my infant shoulders, that he had filched from me my good name and had left me with the empty fame of being his son." He went up to Trinity College, Cambridge, in 1939.

Adult life
When World War II started, Milne left his studies and tried to join the British Army, but failed the medical examination. His father used his influence to allow Milne to join as a sapper in the 2nd Training Battalion of the Royal Engineers. He was commissioned in July 1942, and was posted to the Middle East and then to Italy, where he was wounded as a platoon commander the following year. After the war he returned to Cambridge and completed a degree in English.

On 11 April 1948, Milne became engaged to Lesley de Sélincourt, a first cousin on his mother's side and daughter of the translator Aubrey de Sélincourt, and they married on 24 July 1948. 

In 1951, he and his wife moved to Dartmouth, and opened The Harbour Bookshop on 25 August. This turned out to be a success, although his mother had thought the decision odd, as Milne did not seem to like "business", and as a bookseller he would have to meet fans of his father's work. The shop was closed by its most recent owners in September 2011. 

Milne occasionally visited his father when the elder Milne became ill. After his father died, Milne never returned to Cotchford Farm. His mother eventually sold the farm and moved back to London after disposing of his father's personal possessions. Milne, who did not want any part of his father's royalties, decided to write a book about his childhood. As Milne describes it, that book, The Enchanted Places, "combined to lift me from under the shadow of my father and of Christopher Robin, and to my surprise and pleasure I found myself standing beside them in the sunshine able to look them both in the eye".

Following her husband's death, Daphne Milne had little further contact with her son, did not see him during the last 15 years of her life and refused to see him on her deathbed.

A few months after his father's death in 1956, Christopher Milne's daughter Clare was born and diagnosed with severe cerebral palsy.

Milne gave the original stuffed animals that inspired the Pooh characters to the books' editor, who in turn donated them to the New York Public Library; Marjorie Taylor (in her book Imaginary Companions and the Children Who Create Them) recounts how many were disappointed at this, and Milne had to explain that he preferred to concentrate on the things that currently interested him. He disliked the idea of Winnie-the-Pooh being commercialised.

Death
Christopher Robin Milne, who lived with myasthenia gravis for some years, died in his sleep on 20 April 1996 in Totnes, Devon, at a local hospital, aged 75. Following his death, he was described by one newspaper as a "dedicated atheist."

Family
Christopher Robin Milne had one child, a daughter named Clare, who had cerebral palsy. In adult life, she led several charitable campaigns for the condition, including the Clare Milne Trust. She died in 2012 at the age of 56 of a heart abnormality.

Portrayal
Christopher Robin Milne is portrayed by Will Tilston and Alex Lawther in Goodbye Christopher Robin, a 2017 film which was "inspired by" his relationship with his father.

Bibliography
 The Enchanted Places (Eyre Methuen, 1974) 
 The Path Through the Trees (Eyre Methuen, 1979) 
 The Hollow on the Hill (Methuen, 1982) 
 The Windfall (Methuen, 1985) 
 The Open Garden (Methuen, 1988)

References

Sources
 Thwaite, Ann (1990). A.A. Milne: His Life London: Faber & Faber,  
 
 BBC News article 27 November 2001: Christopher Robin revealed (describes the discovery in 2001 of images of Christopher Robin Milne captured on a 1929 film of a school pageant held in Ashdown Forest, East Sussex).

1920 births
1996 deaths
A. A. Milne
People educated at Stowe School
Deaths from myasthenia gravis
English atheists
English writers
English people of French descent
English people of Scottish descent
Winnie-the-Pooh
Alumni of Trinity College, Cambridge
People from Chelsea, London
British Army personnel of World War II
English booksellers
English book and manuscript collectors
Royal Engineers officers
20th-century English businesspeople
Royal Engineers soldiers